Shahram Sardar (Kurdish: شەهرام سەردار ) is a Kurdish singer. He is known for his music, which Kurdish melodies with his independent style.

Early life and career 

Shahram Sardar, a male Artist/Singer from the beautiful Iraq/Kurdistan/ Sulaymaniyah. Born in 1990, started his music and singing career in 2004.

studied school in Sulaymaniyah, finished elementary school in 2001 and even since then he always been a part of all the art and music classes!

After finished College of Science and Technology, Department of Computer science.

he is also a instrumentalist. and a Production manager at Vino Company for producing music and albums for artists.

Discography

Singles 
 Shofer 2012
 Selfi 2018
 Layli 2019
 Hast 2019
 Yadi To 2017
 Chand Jar 2021
 Bo Toray 2018

References

External links 

* 
 
 
 
 

Kurdish musicians
Kurdish male singers
Living people
Kurdish singer-songwriters
1989 births